Icmadophila eucalypti is a species of lichen in the family Icmadophilaceae. Found in Australia, it was described as new to science in 2011.

References

Lichen species
Lichens described in 2011
Lichens of Australia
Pertusariales
Taxa named by Gintaras Kantvilas